The 2021–22 FIS Freestyle Ski World Cup was the 50th World Cup season in freestyle skiing organised by the International Ski Federation. The season started on 22 October 2021 and finished on 26 March 2022. This season included six disciplines: moguls, aerials, ski cross, halfpipe, slopestyle and big air.

On 1 March 2022, following the 2022 Russian invasion of Ukraine, FIS decided to exclude athletes from Russia and Belarus from FIS competitions, with an immediate effect.

Men

Ski Cross

Moguls

Dual Moguls

Aerials

Halfpipe

Slopestyle

Big Air

Women

Ski Cross

Moguls

Dual Moguls

Aerials

Halfpipe

Slopestyle

Big Air

Team

Ski Cross Team

Team Aerials

Men's standings

Ski Cross

Ski Cross Alps Tour

Overall Moguls

Moguls

Dual Moguls

Aerials

Park & Pipe overall (HP/SS/BA)

Halfpipe

Slopestyle

Big Air

Women's standings

Ski Cross

Ski Cross Alps Tour

Overall Moguls

Moguls

Dual Moguls

Aerials

Park & Pipe overall (HP/SS/BA)

Halfpipe

Slopestyle

Big Air

Team

Team Aerials

Ski Cross Team

Nations Cup

Overall

References 

FIS Freestyle Skiing World Cup
World Cup
World Cup